The 2008 Belmont Stakes was the 140th running of the Belmont Stakes. The race was won by Da'Tara, who led the race wire to wire. Da'Tara went off at 38–1 odds, making the win a monumental upset. Entrants included the favorite, winner of both the Kentucky Derby and Preakness, Big Brown, but he eased on last place, a first for any Triple Crown hopeful. A win by Big Brown would have marked the first Triple Crown since Affirmed in 1978. Other entrants were Derby runners Denis of Cork, Tale of Ekati, and Anak Nakal; Preakness runner up Macho Again and third-place finisher Icabad Crane; and Peter Pan runner, Ready's Echo. The sire of Anak Nakal, Victory Gallop, is a Belmont winner, while Casino Drive has two Belmont-winning siblings.

Casino Drive was scratched from the race the morning of the race with an injured hoof. He was the Peter Pan Stakes winner, and the half brother of 2007 Belmont Stakes winner Rags to Riches and 2006 Belmont Stakes winner Jazil. A win by Casino Drive would have been the first time that siblings have won the same Triple Crown race in three consecutive years. Kent Desormeaux, the regular jockey for both Big Brown and Casino Drive, rode Big Brown while two-time Belmont winner Edgar Prado had been scheduled to ride Casino Drive.

The race was seen before 94,476 fans.

Payout

 $2 Exacta (6-4) Paid $659.00
 $2 Trifecta (6-4-8) Paid $3,703.00
 $2 Trifecta (6-4-9) Paid $3,954.00
 $2 Superfecta (6-4-8-9) Paid $48,637.00
 $2 Superfecta (6-4-9-8) Paid $47,309.00

Results
As provided by Equibase

References

External links
Belmont Homepage

Belmont Stakes races
Belmont Stakes
Belmont Stakes
Belmont Stakes
Belmont Stakes